Al-Salam Mosque (also known as Dar al-Salam Mosque, Arabic pronunciation: Masjid al-Salam) is a mosque located in the Qarabis neighborhood of Homs, Syria. It was designed by architect Shawki Tawokkol and construction was completed in 1980, partially with the support of local volunteers. The Karabyss Muslim Community administers the mosque. 

The al-Salam Mosque consists of a square layout and a rectangular courtyard surrounded by an arcade precedes the mosque's entrance, which is faces Khalaf al-Ahmar Street. Adjacent to the mosque is its three-story minaret. The minaret consists of alternating black-and-white stone in the Mamluk ablaq style.

The mosque was reportedly damaged in the fighting during the ongoing Syrian civil war.

References

Mosques in Homs
1980 establishments in Syria
Mosques completed in 1980